Invasion: Earth may refer to:
 Invasion: Earth (TV series), a BBC science fiction series broadcast in 1998
 A science-fiction novel by Harry Harrison
 Invasion: Earth (board game), a science-fiction wargame published by Game Designers' Workshop, set in the Traveller universe